The Oakland Athletics' 2004 season involved the A's finishing 2nd in the American League West with a record of 91 wins and 71 losses.

Offseason
October 9, 2003: Marco Scutaro was selected off waivers by the Oakland Athletics from the New York Mets.
November 18, 2003: Ted Lilly was traded by the Oakland Athletics to the Toronto Blue Jays for Bobby Kielty.
November 26, 2003: Mark Kotsay was traded by the San Diego Padres to the Oakland Athletics for Terrence Long and Ramón Hernández.
December 3, 2003: Wayne Gomes was signed as a free agent with the Oakland Athletics.
February 6, 2004: Eric Karros was signed as a free agent with the Oakland Athletics.
 March 15, 2004: Mike Oquist was signed as a free agent with the Oakland Athletics.

Regular season

Season standings

Record vs. opponents

Transactions
April 17, 2004: Kirk Saarloos was traded by the Houston Astros to the Oakland Athletics for Chad Harville.
August 3, 2004: Eric Karros was released by the Oakland Athletics.

Roster

Player stats

Batting

Starters by position
Note: Pos = Position; G = Games played; AB = At bats; H = Hits; Avg. = Batting average; HR = Home runs; RBI = Runs batted in

Other batters
Note: G = Games played; AB = At bats; H = Hits; Avg. = Batting average; HR = Home runs; RBI = Runs batted in

Pitching

Starting pitchers
Note: G = Games pitched; IP = Innings pitched; W = Wins; L = Losses; ERA = Earned run average; SO = Strikeouts

Other pitchers 
Note: G = Games pitched; IP = Innings pitched; W = Wins; L = Losses; ERA = Earned run average; SO = Strikeouts

Relief pitchers 
Note: G = Games pitched; IP = Innings pitched; W = Wins; L = Losses; SV = Saves; ERA = Earned runs average; SO = Strikeouts

Farm system 

LEAGUE CHAMPIONS: Sacramento, Modesto

References

2004 Oakland Athletics team page at Baseball Reference
2004 Oakland Athletics team page at www.baseball-almanac.com

Oakland Athletics seasons
Oak
Oakland